The 2012–13 Turkish Ice Hockey Super League season was the 21st season of the Turkish Ice Hockey Super League, the top level of ice hockey in Turkey. 7 teams participated in the league, and Başkent Yıldızları Spor Kulübü won the championship.

Regular season

Playoffs

External links 
 Turkish Ice Hockey Federation

TBHSL
Turkish Ice Hockey Super League seasons
TBHSL